The A574 is a road in England, running through the borough of Warrington before terminating at the end of Butts Bridge in Leigh.

The road passes through the following districts of Warrington and Leigh (in route order):
Sankey Bridges (Start of route)
Old Hall
Westbrook
Callands
Longford
Orford
Padgate
Longbarn
Birchwood
Locking Stumps
Risley
Culcheth
Glazebury
Hope Carr (End of route)

References

Roads in England
Roads in Cheshire
Roads in Greater Manchester